The St. Louis Modern Chinese School (SLMCS) is an American school that teaches Chinese as a second language and Chinese culture. The school is located in the Esquire Building at 6710 Clayton Road in Richmond Heights, Missouri, a suburb of St. Louis.

Founded in 1997 by Chinese Americans of the Mainland China-origin community, the St. Louis Modern Chinese School is a family-oriented non-profit school that is financially supported by volunteers, public donations, and tuition. Students at SLMCS learn about Chinese language and culture, leadership, and responsible citizenship. Students are encouraged to learn about globalization and cultural diversity.

Begun with 40 students, the St. Louis Modern Chinese School had several hundred students within a decade. It now has over 700 students, making it the largest Chinese language school in the Midwest and one of the largest in the United States.

SLMCS is an active member of Chinese School Association in the United States (CSAUS), which has about 150 member schools and more than 20,000 enrolled students.

Electives offered by SLMCS began with dance, waist drum, and arts and crafts. Others were added over the years, including martial arts, math, and an essay class whose finished works were published in the Chinese newspapers in St. Louis. Other classes prepare students for SAT II Math Subject Tests and math contests such as MathCounts, to which SLMCS sent a team of students in 2005 and 2006.  In 2006, the SLMCS team won 1st place but was unable to go on to State MathCounts because the school was not a Monday-Friday school.

St. Louis Modern Chinese School promotes Chinese culture throughout the St. Louis area. SLMCS sets up performances of fan dancing and Chinese Gong Fu and other activities at the University of Missouri–St. Louis, the Missouri Botanical Garden, and various other locations. SLMCS also hosts a Christmas Gala every year featuring performances by students.

See also
 Chinese in St. Louis

References
Notes

Sources

Asian-American culture in Missouri
Educational institutions established in 1997
Schools in St. Louis County, Missouri
Private schools in Missouri
1997 establishments in Missouri